Paul Wekesa (born 2 July 1967) is a former professional tennis player from Kenya. He won 3 doubles titles, achieved a career-high singles ranking of World No. 100 and reached two tour-level quarterfinals at Auckland in 1989 and Seoul in 1995.

Tennis career
Prior to turning professional, he won the doubles tournament at the 1987 Division II NCAA Men's Tennis Championships while attending Chapman University. During his career, Wekesa won 3 ATP Tour doubles titles.  He reached the quarterfinals in doubles at the 1992 Australian Open.
Wekesa won a bronze medal at the 1987 All-Africa Games held in Nairobi, Kenya. He is the only Kenyan tennis player to reach Top 100 of ATP rankings. He also features for the Kenya Davis Cup team and was still active in 1998. He was the first player to be beaten by Tim Henman in the main draw of a Grand Slam tournament, at Wimbledon in 1995.
After retirement from playing, he has served as a Kenyan national teams coach.
He won the "Hall of Fame" category at the 2007 Kenyan Sports Personality of the Year awards.
His father Noah Wekesa is a Kenyan politician and minister.

Career finals

Doubles (3 wins, 3 losses)

References

External links
 
 
 

1967 births
Living people
Kenyan Luhya people
Chapman University alumni
Kenyan expatriate sportspeople in the United States
Kenyan expatriates in the United States
Kenyan male tennis players
Sportspeople from Nairobi
African Games bronze medalists for Kenya
African Games medalists in tennis
Competitors at the 1987 All-Africa Games
College men's tennis players in the United States